The women's handball tournament at the 2018 Mediterranean Games was held from 23 to 30 June at the Pabellón CE Vendrell in El Vendrell and at the Campclar Sports Palace in Tarragona.

Participating teams

 (host)

Group stage
All times are local (UTC+2).

Group A

Group B

Classification stage

Seventh place game

Fifth place game

Playoffs

Bracket

Semifinals

Bronze medal game

Final

Final standings

References

External links
2018 Mediterranean Games

Handball at the 2018 Mediterranean Games
Mediterranean Games